In the 1895 Iowa State Senate elections Iowa voters elected state senators to serve in the twenty-sixth Iowa General Assembly. Elections were held in 31 of the state senate's 50 districts. State senators serve four-year terms in the Iowa State Senate.

A statewide map of the 50 state Senate districts in the 1895 elections is provided by the Iowa General Assembly here.

The general election took place on November 5, 1895.

Following the previous election, Republicans had control of the Iowa Senate with 34 seats to Democrats' 16 seats.

To claim control of the chamber from Republicans, the Democrats needed to net 10 Senate seats.

Republicans maintained control of the Iowa State Senate following the 1895 general election with the balance of power shifting to Republicans holding 43 seats and Democrats having 7 seats (a net gain of 9 seats for Republicans).

Summary of Results
Note: The holdover Senators not up for re-election are not listed on this table.

Source:

Detailed Results
NOTE: The Iowa Official Register does not contain detailed vote totals for state senate elections in 1895.

See also
 Elections in Iowa

References

Iowa Senate
Iowa
Iowa Senate elections